Robin Gammell (born September 22, 1936) is a Canadian film, television and stage actor.

Career
Gammell began acting as a junior ensemble member at the Stratford Shakespeare Festival, playing roles including Robin Starveling in A Midsummer Night's Dream, Octavius in Julius Caesar, Ariel in The Tempest, and Malcolm in Macbeth; he later reprised this role for the 1961 television film Macbeth opposite Sean Connery in the title role. He later moved on to film and television work, including the films The Pyx (1973), Lipstick (1976), Raid on Entebbe (1977), Rituals (1977), Full Circle (1977), The Concorde ... Airport '79 (1979), Murder by Phone (1982), The Star Chamber (1983), Project X (1987) and Striker's Mountain (1987), recurring or starring roles in Wiseguy, WIOU, Street Legal, Amazing Grace, Millennium, Manhattan, AZ and Judging Amy, and guest appearances in The Blue and the Gray, Hill Street Blues, L.A. Law, The Commish, Murder, She Wrote, Matlock, Nip/Tuck, Star Trek: The Next Generation, and How to Get Away With Murder. He received a Genie Award nomination for Best Actor, at the 1st Genie Awards in 1980, for Klondike Fever.

Gammell has also portrayed several noted historical figures in docudrama films and television series, including Walter Moberly in The National Dream: Building the Impossible Railway, American espionage chief William J. Donovan in the television miniseries A Man Called Intrepid, and Adolf Hitler in an episode of Witness to Yesterday.

Personal life
Gammell was in a relationship with Gretchen Corbett. They had one child, Winslow Corbett, in 1979.

Filmography

Film

Television

References

External links

1936 births
Canadian male film actors
Canadian male television actors
Canadian male stage actors
Anglophone Quebec people
Male actors from Montreal
Living people
20th-century Canadian male actors
21st-century Canadian male actors